Mark D Duda (born February 4, 1961) is a former professional American football defensive tackle in the National Football League. He played his entire NFL career with the St. Louis Cardinals from 1983 until 1987. 

From 1979 to 1982, Duda played college football at Maryland, where he recorded 19 sacks (13 of them in his last season). He played in 55 NFL games for the Cardinals between 1983 and 1987.  

Duda became the defensive coordinator for Lackawanna College in 1993 when the school started its football program. He became the head coach the next season. As of 2018, Duda was the winningest football coach in junior college history. In 2019, Lackawanna went to its first NJCAA National Football Championship.

Notes and References

1961 births
Living people
People from Plymouth, Pennsylvania
Players of American football from Pennsylvania
American football defensive tackles
Maryland Terrapins football players
St. Louis Cardinals (football) players
Junior college football coaches in the United States